An abbot is the head of a monastery; the term is usually used in a Christian context but is used sometimes in a Buddhist context:

 Abbot (Buddhism) 

Abbot may also refer to:

People
Abbot Kinney (1850–1920), American developer and conservationist
Abbot Howard Hoffman, a.k.a. Abbie Hoffman, American social and political activist
"The Abbot," a pseudonym of Rza, an American rapper
 Abbot (surname), list of notable people with the surname

Places
 Abbot, Maine, in Piscataquis County
 Abbots Creek, tributary of Back Creek in New Jersey
 Abbot (crater), lunar impact crater named for Charles Greeley Abbot

Other uses
 Abbot (artillery), a self-propelled gun
 Abbot, a GWR Waverley Class 4-4-0 broad gauge steam locomotive
 Leon Abbot (Artemis Fowl), an Artemis Fowl character
The Abbot, a novel by Sir Walter Scott
 Abbot Group, an oil and gas services company
 Abbot Primate, the elected representative for Benedictines monks of the Benedictine Confederation of monasteries

See also

Abbott (disambiguation)